= Slick! =

Board game

Slick! is a board game published in 1988 by Rostherne Games.

== Contents ==
Slick! is a game in which players buy shares in seven fictional oil companies to gain control over the companies and make the most money.

== Reception ==
Mike Siggins reviewed Slick! for Games International magazine, and gave it 2 stars out of 5, and stated that "the game is acceptably packaged and priced, but this does not explain the uninspiring game system. If anything more commercial is sought then Slick! needs a lot of work."
